Rydal Mount is a house in the small village of Rydal, near Ambleside in the English Lake District.  It is best known as the home of the poet William Wordsworth from 1813 to his death in 1850.  It is currently operated as a writer's home museum.

History
Wordsworth was born in Cockermouth in Cumberland in 1770, and knew the Lake District well from his childhood.  He moved away to study at the University of Cambridge in 1787, and then travelled in Britain and continental Europe for 12 years.  He spent over 8 years at Dove Cottage in nearby Grasmere from 1799 to 1808, but was forced to move to accommodate his growing family and many visitors.  After a period in Allan Bank in Grasmere, the Wordsworths moved to Rydal Mount in 1813.

Both Grasmere and Windermere lakes can be seen from the hillside grounds of Rydal Mount.  William designed the layout of the gardens at Rydal, and he often said that those grounds were his office as opposed to the spacious office/writing room in his house.  On the high side of the grounds, tucked away from the main house, but overlooking both the grounds and the two nearby lakes, he built the "Writing Hut" where he spent most of his writing time.  This hut consisted merely of a bench with a small roof, but it provided shelter from the frequent rains and escape from the house.  He lived the rest of his life there until his death at the age of 80, and he frequently was visited by Samuel Taylor Coleridge who would walk down from his home in Keswick.

The Wordsworths continued to rent this property for 46 years, following William's death in 1850 to the death of his wife, Mary, in 1859.

Rydal Mount was acquired in 1969 by Mary Henderson (née Wordsworth), William's great great granddaughter.  It remains in the ownership of the Wordsworth family, and has been opened to the public since 1970.

Gallery

See also 

 Grade I listed buildings in Cumbria
 Listed buildings in Lakes, Cumbria
 Rydal Hall
 Rydal Water
 Dora's Field

References

External links 

 
Rydal Mount Guide to the Lake District

Museums established in 1970
Gardens in Cumbria
Historic house museums in Cumbria
Biographical museums in Cumbria
Literary museums in England
Poetry museums
Grade I listed buildings in Cumbria
William Wordsworth
Tourist attractions in Cumbria
1970 establishments in England
Grade I listed houses
Grade II listed parks and gardens in Cumbria